Pseudoalteromonas agarivorans is a marine bacterium.

External links

Type strain of Pseudoalteromonas agarivorans at BacDive -  the Bacterial Diversity Metadatabase

Alteromonadales
Bacteria described in 2003